Pages is a word processor developed by Apple Inc. It is part of the iWork productivity suite and runs on the macOS, iPadOS and iOS operating systems. It is also available on iCloud on the web. The first version of Pages was released in February 2005. Pages is marketed by Apple as an easy-to-use application that allows users to quickly create documents on their devices. A number of Apple-designed templates comprising different themes (such as: letters, résumés, posters and outlines) are included with Pages.

History 
On January 11, 2005, Apple announced the first version of Pages, as part of iWork '05. On January 6, 2009, Apple released the fourth version of Pages as a component of iWork '09. On January 27, 2010, Apple announced a new version of Pages for iPad with a touch interface. On May 31, 2011, Apple updated the iOS version of Pages to 1.4, bringing universal binaries, allowing the app to be run on iPad, iPhone and iPod Touch devices. On October 12, 2011, Apple updated the iOS app to version 1.5, adding the iCloud "Documents in the Cloud" feature. iOS Pages was updated to version 1.6 on March 7, 2012, and will only run on iOS 5.1 or later. Pages for OS X was updated to version 4.3 on December 4, 2012, to support Pages 1.7 for iOS, which was released on the same day. Pages for iOS 1.7.1 introduced better compatibility with Word and Pages for Mac and version 1.7.2, released on March 7, 2013, merely added stability improvements and bug fixes.

On October 23, 2013, Apple released a redesign with Pages 5.0 and made it free for anyone with an iOS device. In this release, many templates, as well as some advanced features that were available in version 4.3, were not included. Some of these missing features were put back over the next releases but the current version (12.1) still lacks features from version 4.3, including the ability to select non-contiguous regions of text, advanced find/replace functions, and more.

Features
Pages is a word processor and page layout application. When Pages is first opened, users are presented with a template chooser which allows them to start with a blank document or with a predesigned template — including a basic, report, letter, résumé, envelope, business card, flyers & posters, cards, miscellaneous and a newsletter section of templates — that contains placeholder text and images which can be replaced by dragging and dropping photos from the Media Browser. The Media Browser provides quick access to media from iTunes, iMovie and Photos. Users can drag and drop music, movies, and photos directly into Pages documents from the Media Browser window.

Each document window contains a toolbar, which gives one-click access to commonly used functions such as inserting objects (text boxes, shapes, tables, charts, and comments), uploading the document to iWork.com, and adding additional pages. In addition, the document window contains a contextual format bar that allows one-click formatting of text and adjustments to images. When text is selected, the format bar enables users to choose fonts, text size, and color, and to adjust line spacing and alignment. When an image is selected, the format bar displays tools to adjust opacity, show and hide shadow and reflection effects and mask the image. A separate Inspector window provides almost all formatting options available for any element in the open document.

Beginning in iWork '08, word processing and page layout are two distinct modes. In word processing mode, Pages supports headers and footers, footnotes and outline, and list creation. Users can collaborate with others on a document. Pages tracks changes by users by displaying each person's edits in different colors. Users can also add comments alongside the document. In page layout mode, users have complete control over the position of objects on the page. Images and text can be placed anywhere on the canvas.

Pages used to feature several other advanced writing tools. Many of these have been stripped out of the current version. The "Full Screen" mode (introduced in Mac OS X Lion) and supported in Pages 4.1 hid the menubar and toolbars, allowing users to focus on a single document without being distracted by other windows on the screen; however, after Pages 5, full-screen mode requires the user to manually hide various panes for focused writing and the page thumbnails pane does not automatically open when the cursor is moved to the left screen edge. Earlier versions featured mail merge, which automatically populated custom fields with contact data from the Address Book or Numbers apps to create personalized documents. For example, if a user wanted to send one letter to three people, mail merge allowed the user to create a single document with placeholder fields that were populated when printing. The mail merge feature was completely removed in version 5 and it did not return until version 12.1. Tables and charts pasted from Numbers are automatically updated if the original spreadsheet is changed.

Compatibility

Pages can import some Microsoft Word documents (including Word 2007's Office Open XML format). Pages 4 and earlier could also import AppleWorks word processing documents, and export documents to rich text, but those features were removed until Pages 6.1. Pages 5 can still export to PDF, EPUB and Microsoft Word DOC formats.

Simple and complex mathematical equations can be written for a Pages document with macOS's Grapher, offering similar capabilities to Microsoft Equation Editor (plus 2D and 3D rendering tools only Grapher can use).

As of January 2015, Pages does not support OpenDocument file format. 

The only known software other than Pages which can open its files are Apple's iWork productivity suite through Apple's iCloud, LibreOffice and Jumpshare. Windows users can view and edit Pages files using iWork for iCloud via a web browser. The iCloud system can also read Microsoft Word files and convert Pages files to Microsoft Word format. Jumpshare can view Pages files.

Other than accessing iCloud through a browser, no program can officially view or edit a Pages file using Windows or Linux. Some content can be retrieved from a document created in Pages '09 because a .pages file is a bundle. A user can open a .pages file in an unpackaging program or by renaming files as .zip files in Windows (XP and onwards) and will find either a .jpg or .pdf preview in its entirety for viewing and printing, although this is only possible if the creator of the .pages files elected to include a preview. The user will also find a .xml file with unformatted text. This process can also be used for users of the 2008 version of Pages to open documents saved in the 2009 version of Pages, which are not backward compatible.

Pages can also export documents into several formats; formatting is generally retained during the export process.

Version history

See also
 List of word processors
 Comparison of word processors

References

External links
  – official site
 Pages free resources at iWork Community
 Screenplay template

 MacOS word processors
 MacOS-only software made by Apple Inc.
 IOS-based software made by Apple Inc.
2005 software
iOS software
 Freeware
 Word processors